Mary Parker may refer to:

People 
 Mary Parker (American actress) (1918–1998), American stage, television and screen actress/performer
 Mary Parker (Australian actress) (born 1930), English (later Australian) actress and news reporter; first woman to appear on Melbourne television
 Mary Parker, governess of Erasmus Darwin
 Mary Parker, Jr. (1774–1859), daughter of Erasmus Darwin, born of an extra-marital affair
 Mary Elizabeth Parker, American poet
 Mary Elizabeth Parker Bouligny Levey (1839–1908), author and socialite
 Mary Evelyn Parker (1920–2015), former Democratic state treasurer of Louisiana
 Mary-Louise Parker (born 1964), American actress
 Mary Parker Follett (1868–1933), American social worker and management consultant
 Mary Parker Lewis, political consultant who served as Chief of Staff to Alan Keyes, candidate for President of the United States
 Mary Parker (Salem witch trials) (died 1692), executed for witchcraft in the Salem witch trials
 Mary Parker (ice hockey), American women's ice hockey player
 Mary Parker, Countess of Macclesfield (died 1823)
 Mary Ann Parker (1765–1848), English traveller and writer
 Mary Celestia Parler (1904–1981), folklorist, sometimes known as Mary Parker

Characters 
 Richard and Mary Parker, comic book characters (parents of Spider-Man)
 Mary Jane Parker, comic book character (one-time wife of Spider-Man)

See also
 Mary (disambiguation)
 Parker (disambiguation)